Treasure Island is a 1999 film adaptation of Robert Louis Stevenson's 1883 novel. It was written and directed by Peter Rowe and stars Kevin Zegers as Jim Hawkins and Jack Palance as Long John Silver.

Premise
The narrative takes place in 1759 and diverges from that of the novel in that Captain Smollett convinces Squire Trelawney and Doctor Livesey to cut Jim, a 13-year old boy, out of his rightful share of the treasure. Jim then teams up with Silver; Smollett, Trelawney, and Livesey are killed; and Jim, Silver, and Ben Gunn escape with the treasure.

Cast
Jack Palance as Long John Silver
Kevin Zegers as Jim Hawkins
Christopher Benjamin as Squire Trelawney 
Malcolm Stoddard as Captain Smollett
 David Robb as Doctor Livesey
Patrick Bergin as Billy Bones
 Cody Palance as Blind Pew
 Dermot Keaney as Israel Hands
Al Hunter Ashton as George Merry

Production
The film was shot in various locations on the Isle of Man, and distributed by Columbia TriStar and Fries Film Group. The vessel used to portray the Hispaniola was the tall ship Earl of Pembroke.

References

External links
 Treasure Island (1999) at the Internet Movie Database
 

1999 films
1990s adventure films
Treasure Island films
American adventure films
Films set in the 1750s
Films set in the 18th century
1990s English-language films
Films directed by Peter Rowe
1990s American films